Norbert Mészáros (born 19 August 1980) is a Hungarian professional footballer. He is usually deployed as a central defender but can also play left back.

Club career
Born in Pápa, Mészáros started playing football with his local team Pápai ELC. In 2000, his career took off when he signed for Dunaújváros FC. Other teams he played for include BKV Előre, BFC Siófok and the German team FC Energie Cottbus. Since 2005, Mészáros has played for OTP Bank Liga side Debreceni VSC.

Debrecen
On 8 September 2010, Mészáros was suspended by UEFA along with teammate Vukašin Poleksić, as a match between Debrecen and Fiorentina in the 2009–10 UEFA Champions League was investigated for match-fixing. Both players appealed and on 5 May 2011 the Court of Arbitration for Sport announced its decision, with the ban of Poleksić being upheld and Mészáros' ban being rescinded. UEFA's evidence against Mészáros failed to prove "to the comfortable satisfaction" of the panel that he violated the rules.

Mészáros won the Hungarian League with Debrecen in the 2009–10 season despite his team losing to Kecskeméti TE in the last match. On 26 May 2010, Debrecen beat Zalaegerszegi TE 3–2 in the Hungarian Cup final at the Ferenc Puskás Stadium.

On 1 May 2012, Mészáros won the Hungarian Cup with Debrecen by beating MTK Budapest on a penalty shoot-out in the 2011–12 season. This was the fifth Hungarian Cup trophy for Debrecen.

On 12 May 2012, Mészáros won another Hungarian League title with Debrecen after beating Pécsi MFC 4–0 at the Stadion Oláh Gábor Út. This was the sixth Hungarian League title for the Hajdús.

In the summer 2019 it was announced, that Mészáros would continue as a playing assistant manager for the second team of Debrecen and also would be available for the first team if they needed him.

International career
Mészáros made his debut for the Hungary national team on 1 June 2012 in the 2–1 win over the Czech Republic in a friendly.

Career statistics

Honours
Debrecen
 Hungarian League: 2010, 2012
 Hungarian Cup: 2010, 2012

References

External links
Norbert Mészáros profile at magyarfutball.hu
Norbert Mészáros player info at the official DVSC website 

1980 births
Living people
People from Pápa
Hungarian footballers
Hungary international footballers
Association football defenders
Dunaújváros FC players
BKV Előre SC footballers
BFC Siófok players
FC Energie Cottbus players
Debreceni VSC players
Nemzeti Bajnokság I players
Hungarian expatriate footballers
Expatriate footballers in Germany
Hungarian expatriate sportspeople in Germany
Sportspeople from Veszprém County